Ingrid Fiskaa (born 16 April 1977) is a Norwegian activist and politician for the Socialist Left Party.

Political career

Early career
She was the leader of the Socialist Youth from 2002 to 2004, and also a central committee member of the Socialist Left Party.

Party politics
In 2007, she was a candidate to become deputy leader of the Socialist Left Party, but lost out to Bård Vegar Solhjell at the national convention.

On 16 December 2022, she announced her candidacy for the deputy leadership in 2023, while also endorsing Kirsti Bergstø for leader, reiterating her county chapter's endorsement.

Parliament
She served as a deputy representative to the Parliament of Norway from Rogaland from 1997 to 2005, and 2009 to 2013. She was elected as a permanent representative following the 2021 election. She was also appointed fifth Vice President of the Storting.

Government
In November 2009, as a part of Stoltenberg's Second Cabinet, Fiskaa was appointed State Secretary for Erik Solheim in the Ministry of Foreign Affairs.

Other
Fiskaa became a board member of Attac Norway in 2004, and leader of the anti-war organization Fredsinitiativet ('The Peace Initiative') in 2005. She stepped down from Fredsinitiativet in 2008. She has been suggested by peace activist Fredrik Heffermehl as a new member of the Norwegian Nobel Committee.

Personal life and education
She hails from Bryne, and has a bachelor's degree from the University of Stavanger. In 2009 she graduated with a master's degree in history from the University of Oslo.

See also
 List of peace activists

References

1977 births
Living people
People from Time, Norway
Socialist Left Party (Norway) politicians
Deputy members of the Storting
Norwegian state secretaries
Rogaland politicians
Women members of the Storting
Norwegian anti-war activists
University of Stavanger alumni
University of Oslo alumni
Norwegian women state secretaries